ICIG may refer to:

Inspector General of the Intelligence Community, an Inspector General office in the Office of Inspector General (United States) abbreviated IC IG
International Consortium of Investigative Journalists, part of the Center for Public Integrity
Institut du Cancer et d'Immunogénétique (ICIG) that presents the Georges Mathé Award
Iran Compress Industrial Group